Sammy is a nickname. 

It may also refer to:

People
 Daren Sammy (born 1983), Saint Lucian cricketer
 Jasmine Sammy, Trinidad and Tobago cricketer in the 1970s
 DJ Sammy, stage name of Spanish DJ and producer Samuel Bouriah (born 1969)

Arts and entertainment
 Sammy (comics), a Belgian comics series which began in 1970
 Sammy (band), the 1994-1996 partnership of guitarist Luke Wood and guitarist/vocalist Jesse Hartman
 Sammy (TV series), a short-lived 2000 American animated television series

Other uses
 Sammy Corporation, a Japanese manufacturer of games and a subsidiary of Sega Sammy
 Sigma Alpha Mu, a college fraternity also known as "Sammy"